Sin senos sí hay paraíso, also known as Sin tetas sí hay paraíso, is a Spanish-language telenovela produced by Fox Telecolombia and Telemundo Studios for Telemundo and Caracol Televisión, based on the book Sin tetas sí hay paraíso of the writer Gustavo Bolívar. It is also a sequel to Sin senos no hay paraíso produced in 2008. It started airing on American broadcast channel Telemundo on July 19, 2016.

On November 28, 2016, Telemundo confirmed that the show has been renewed for a second season.

On October 4, 2017, Gustavo Bolívar confirmed that the show has been renewed for a third season.

Series overview

Episode list

Season 1 (2016)

Season 2 (2017)

Season 3 (2018)

Specials

References 

Lists of American drama television series episodes
Lists of soap opera episodes
Sin senos sí hay paraíso